Placido Fabris (Pieve d'Alpago, near Belluno, August 26, 1802 - Venice, December 1, 1859) was an Italian painter.

He was a pupil of the Academy of Fine Arts of Venice, and was involved in creating restorations and copies for churches in Venice

References

1802 births
1859 deaths
19th-century Italian painters
19th-century Italian male artists
Italian male painters
Painters from Venice
People from Belluno
Accademia di Belle Arti di Venezia alumni